Nocardiopsis halophila  is a halophilic bacterium from the genus of Nocardiopsis which has been isolated from saline soil in Iraq.

References

External links
Type strain of Nocardiopsis halophila at BacDive -  the Bacterial Diversity Metadatabase	

Actinomycetales
Bacteria described in 1994